LRRTM1 is a brain-expressed imprinted gene that encodes a leucine-rich repeat transmembrane protein that interacts with neurexins and neuroligins to modulate synaptic cell adhesion in neurons. As the name implies, its protein product is a transmembrane protein that contains many leucine rich repeats.  It is expressed during the development of specific forebrain structures and shows a variable pattern of maternal downregulation (genomic imprinting).

Clinical significance 

LRRTM1 is the first gene linked to increased odds of being left-handed, when inherited from the father's side. Possessing one particular variant of the LRRTM1 gene slightly raises the risk of psychotic mental illnesses such as schizophrenia, again only if inherited from the father's side. As well, LRRTM1 has been associated with measures of schizotypy in non-clinical populations, indicating that the gene may have shared effects on neurodevelopment in both healthy and unhealthy individuals and individuals with schizophrenia. 

LRRTM1 is also critically involved in synapse formation within the dorsal Lateral geniculate nucleus (dLGN) of mice. LRRTM1 aids in the assembly of complex retinogenciulate synapses in mice, which are believed to help process complex visual signals. Lack of this gene shows decreased performance in complex visual tasks.

See also 
 Handedness

References

Further reading 

 
 
 
 
 
 
 
 
 

Genes on human chromosome 2
Motor skills